K. K. Tewary (born 1942) was an Indian Parliamentarian and Union Minister in former Prime Minister Rajiv Gandhi's Union Council of Ministers. He was elected twice in 1980 and 1984 from Buxar Lok Sabha Constituency.

References

1942 births
Living people
Lok Sabha members from Bihar
Place of birth missing (living people)
Date of birth missing (living people)